The 1971 European Judo Championships were the 20th edition of the European Judo Championships, and were held in Gothenburg, Sweden on 21 and 22 May 1971. Championships were subdivided into six individual competitions, and a separate team competition.

Medal overview

Individual

Teams

Medal table

References 
 Results of the 1971 European Judo Championships (JudoInside.com)

E
European Judo Championships
1971 in Swedish sport
Judo competitions in Sweden
International sports competitions in Gothenburg
May 1971 sports events in Europe
1970s in Gothenburg